The interim government of the Islamic Republic of Iran (21 September 1981 – 29 October 1981) was established after the assassination of Mohammad-Ali Rajai (President) and Mohammad Javad Bahonar (Prime Minister) on 30 August. In accordance with the constitution, a Provisional Presidential Council formed the same day and proposed Mohammad-Reza Mahdavi Kani as Prime Minister to the Majlis. Majlis voted in favour of him on 2 September. His cabinet also received approval of the Majlis on 3 September. The main responsibility of this government was holding presidential elections. On 13 October, Ali Khamenei officially became president. His Prime Minister, Mir-Hossein Mousavi received Majlis's approval on 29 October (after Majlis' negative vote to Khamenei's first candidate, Ali Akbar Velayati) and then the new government replaced Mahdavi-Kani's interim government.

Cabinet members

See also

 1979 Iranian Interim Government

References

1981 establishments in Iran
1981 disestablishments in Iran
Cabinets established in 1981
Cabinets disestablished in 1981
Interim government, 1981
Interim government
Interim